Cornel Rusu (born 10 September 1944) is a Romanian water polo player. He competed at the 1972 Summer Olympics and the 1976 Summer Olympics.

References

1944 births
Living people
Romanian male water polo players
Olympic water polo players of Romania
Water polo players at the 1972 Summer Olympics
Water polo players at the 1976 Summer Olympics
Sportspeople from Craiova